Thunder on South Mountain is a board wargame that simulates the American Civil War battle of South Mountain Maryland, fought on September 14, 1862. In this battle, Union forces fought under the command of  Maj. Gen. George B. McClellan and Confederate forces were under the command of Maj. Gen. Daniel Harvey Hill. Players play the role of these commanders in this tactical, brigade-level simulation. The game has low complexity and an emphasis on command and control.

Awards 

Thunder on South Mountain won the 2003 Charles S. Roberts Award for best desktop publishing produced boardgame.

See also 
 Tabletop game
 Tactical wargame

References

External links 
 Blue Guidon
 

American Civil War board wargames
Board games introduced in 2000